Joanna Douglas may refer to:

Joanna Douglas (actress),  Canadian actress
Joanna Douglas (Neighbours), recurring character in the Australian soap opera Neighbours
Joanna Douglas (American actor) in Diamond Safari (1958 film)